Secamonopsis madagascariensis is a species of plant in the family Apocynaceae. It is endemic to Madagascar.

References

Endemic flora of Madagascar
Secamonoideae